The 2020–21 Montenegrin First League was the 15th season of the top-tier association football in Montenegro. The season began on 14 August 2020 and ended on 25 May 2021. The league winners qualified for a place in the 2021–22 UEFA Champions League.
Budućnost were the defending champions after winning the league in the previous season.

Teams

Defender of the title was Budućnost, while other teams which participated in previous season were Sutjeska, Iskra, Zeta, Podgorica, Petrovac, Rudar and Titograd.
Grbalj and Kom were relegated at the end of the previous season.
After earning promotion from the Montenegrin Second League, FK Dečić and FK Jezero competed in the league this season.
The following clubs competed in 2020–21 First League.

League table

Results
Clubs were scheduled to play each other four times for a total of 36 matches each.

First half of season

Second half of season

Relegation play-offs
The 10th-placed team (against the 3rd-placed team of the Second League) and the 11th-placed team (against the runners-up of the Second League) will both compete in two-legged relegation play-offs after the end of the season.

Summary

Matches

Iskra won 3–1 on aggregate.

4–4 on aggregate. Petrovac won on penalties.

Statistics

Top goalscorers

See also 
 Montenegrin First League

References

External links 
 UEFA
 FSCG

Montenegrin First League seasons
Monte
1